In Malaysia, federal budgets are presented annually by the Government of Malaysia to identify proposed government revenues and spending and forecast economic conditions for the upcoming year, and its fiscal policy for the forward years. The federal budget includes the government's estimates of revenue and spending and may outline new policy initiatives. Federal budgets are usually released in October, before the start of the fiscal year. All of the Malaysian states also present budgets. Since state finances are dependent on money from the federal government, these budgets are usually released after the federal one.

The federal budget is a major state financial plan for the fiscal year, which has the force of law after its approval by the Malaysian parliament and signed into law by the Yang di-Pertuan Agong.

Revenue estimates detailed in the budget are raised through the Malaysian taxation system, with government spending representing a sizeable proportion of the overall economy. Besides presenting the government's expected revenues and expenditures, the federal budget is also a political statement of the government's intentions and priorities, and has profound macroeconomic implications.

Budget process
The budget is announced in the Dewan Rakyat (House of Representatives) by the Minister of Finance, who traditionally wears baju Melayu while doing so. The Budget is then voted on by the House. Budgets are a confidence measure, and if the House votes against it the government can fall, although never happened to Prime Minister to date. The governing party strictly enforces party discipline, usually expelling from the party caucus any government Member of Parliament (MP) who votes against the budget. Opposition parties almost always vote against the budget. Since 2008, the opposition bloc used to prepare a complete alternative budget and present this alternative to the Malaysian people along with the main budget. In cases of minority government, the government has normally had to include major concessions to one of the smaller parties to ensure passage of the budget.

Malaysia follows the conventions of the Westminster system. For example, the prime minister must have the support of a majority in the Dewan Rakyat (House of Representatives), and must in any case be able to ensure the existence of no absolute majority against the government. In relation to the budget, that requires that if the House fails to pass the government's budget, even by one ringgit, then the government must either resign so that a different government can be appointed or seek a parliamentary dissolution so that new general elections may be held to re-confirm or deny the government's mandate.

The process of creating the budget is a complex one which begins within the working ranks for the Federal Government. Each year, the various departments and agencies that make up the Government submit what are called 'The Main Estimates' to The Treasury Board Secretariat. These documents identify the planned expenditure of each department and agency, linking these proposed expenses to programs, to objectives and ultimately to the priorities of the current ruling Government. The Treasury Board Secretariat combines these budget estimates and compile an initial proposed budget. From there, the Cabinet and Prime Minister's Department adjust the budget based on a series of economic, social and political factors. In reality, decisions are usually made with the primary intend of re-election and so often include advantages for key regions and lobby groups.

The government reserves the right to submit "supplementary supply bills", which add additional funding above and beyond what was originally appropriated at the beginning of the fiscal year. Supplementary supply bills can be used for things like disaster relief and to update its agencies' spending totals for the current financial year and report any governmental re-organisations.

Classification of revenue
The Federal Government’s revenue is classified into four general categories, namely tax revenue, non-tax revenue, non-revenue receipts and revenue from the Federal Territories.

Tax revenue
Tax revenue is classified into direct tax revenue and indirect tax revenue.

Direct tax revenue includes revenue from:
 income tax and supplementary income tax (individual, company, petroleum, withholding and cooperatives);
 estate duty;
 stamp duty;
 real property gains tax (RPGT); 
 Labuan offshore business activity tax; and
 miscellaneous direct taxes.

Indirect tax revenue includes revenue from:
 Goods and Services Tax (GST);
 export duties;
 import duties; 
 excise duties;
 levies; and
 miscellaneous indirect taxes.

Non-tax revenue
Non-tax revenue consists of:
 licences, registration fees and permits: inclusive of all charges imposed on the granting of rights to individuals, corporations, businesses including petroleum royalty, and other enterprises as well as motor vehicle licences for purpose of regulation or control and levy on foreign workers;
 service fees: inclusive of receipts from services rendered by the Federal Government to the public;
 proceeds from sales of goods: inclusive of receipts from the sales of physical assets owned by the Government including lands, buildings, office equipments, storage facilities and the sale of miscellaneous goods to the public;
 rentals: inclusive of rentals from land, buildings, vehicles and machineries;
 interests and proceeds from investments: inclusive of proceeds from sale of investments, dividends earned from bonds or shares (PETRONAS dividend, Bank Negara dividend, Khazanah dividend), bank interests and interests on loans granted by the Government;
 fines and penalties: inclusive of out-of-court settlement fees as well as fines and forfeitures;
 contributions and compensations received from home and abroad; 
 income from exploration of oil and gas: income from petroleum operation Malaysia-Thailand Joint Authority (MTJA); and
 other non-tax revenue.

Non-revenue receipts
Non-revenue receipts include:
 refunds of expenditures: inclusive of payments in previous years and refunds of salaries arising from resignations and training expenses, trust fund refunded and unclaimed funds; and
 inter-departmental credits: inclusive of transfer of funds between ministries or departments for services rendered between Government agencies, reimbursements of the Government’s contributions under the Employees Provident Fund Scheme and contributions from Government departments, statutory bodies or Government owned enterprises.

Revenue from the Federal Territories
Revenue from the Federal Territories consist of tax and non-tax revenue including receipts from licences and permits, premiums, quit rent, sale of assets, rentals, service fees and entertainment duties.

Example Budget

Projected revenues

Official sources

(In million MYR)

Projected expenditures by object
Official sources

These tables are in million MYR.

Projected expenditures by budget function
Official sources

These tables are in million MYR. The budget for the 2016 fiscal year (also demonstrating the basic budget structure) can be found below.

List of Malaysian budgets by year

Supply Bills - Second Reading
1960s 1960 · 1961 · 1962 · 1963 · 1964 · 1965 · 1966 · 1967 · 1968 · 1969

1970s 1973 · 1974 · 1975 · 1976 · 1977 · 1978 · 1979

1980s 1980 · 1981 · 1982 · 1983 · 1984 · 1985 · 1986 · 1987 · 1988 · 1989

1990s 1990 · 1991 · 1992 · 1993 · 1994 · 1995 · 1996 · 1997 · 1998 · 1999

2000s 2000 · 2001 · 2002 · 2003 · 2004 · 2005 · 2006 · 2007 · 2008 · 2009

2010s 2010 · 2011 · 2012 · 2013 · 2014 · 2015 · 2016 · 2017 · 2018 · 2019 ·

2020s 2020

See also
 Taxation in Malaysia
 Malaysian public debt

International:
 Government budget by country

References

External links
 Ministry of Finance

Further reading
 

 
Economy of Malaysia
Budget